Gummibär or Gummy Bear (German for "gummy bear") is a German-origin Euro-Dance multilingual character and virtual band that performs gummy bear-related songs on various albums, including I Am Your Gummy Bear (2007) and La La Love to Dance (2010). The video for the song "I'm a Gummy Bear" has 3 billion views on YouTube.

Name origins and appearance
The name "Gummibär" is taken from a German brand of bear-shaped gum candies from Haribo introduced in 1920. The highly stylized green blue-eyed obese gelatinous bear character wears an orange Y-front briefs/underwear and white  sneakers. Gummibär also seems to be bitten with a small portion of the upper left ear missing. The bear's muzzle or, allowing for anthropomorphic, his mustache and goatee, appear to be carpet (in earlier media, seemingly sugar-frosted), and the character only has two small teeth spaced far apart on his lower jaw. Gummibär's right iris and pupil are greater in size than the corresponding left-sided features.

Popularity
Gummibär's popularity as a phenomenon is very similar to that of fellow European music phenomenon Crazy Frog, characterized by repetition of lyrics and singing of catchy melodies. Variants of the character's music have been released in various languages internationally.

The related products are marketed by Gummybear International, which is responsible for the creation, development, and branding of Gummibär animations, as well as musical content and production. Merchandise includes musical and video products (CDs, DVDs, downloads and ringtones) and video games. The company is headquartered in New Jersey, United States.

In June 2012, Gummybear International gained a licensing and co-branding deal with the Greek toy manufacturer Jumbo and Brazilian record label Som Livre in August that includes deals on merchandising and releases on different formats.

In July 2017, Gummybear International launched a new character named Paperotti, who is a yellow duck with a blue feather on his forehead, Paperotti's channel features music videos and animated shorts. Paperotti has since featured in several Gummibär videos.

Video
The video, a 30-second CGI pop promo animated in Softimage XSI, was directed, designed and animated by Pete Dodd and produced through Wilfilm in Copenhagen for Ministry of Sound GmbH in Berlin. The original video was a 30-second version of the Hungarian version, "Itt Van A Gumimaci" which was posted on site Mojoflix.com

DVD
Gummibär: I Am Gummy Bear - The Gummibär Video Collection was released on April 28, 2009, in the United States. The DVD contains a video collection of "I'm a Gummy Bear" in nine different languages, as well as some of the character's other releases. They promote their merch by putting it in their videos at the beginning of the music videos.

Other media

Film 
Gummibär: The Yummy Gummy Search for Santa was released in the United Kingdom on October 8, 2012, and in the United States on November 6, 2012 from Lionsgate Home Entertainment. It's Gummibär's first feature-length film. Aside from the titular character, it stars Harry, a male chameleon, Vampiro, a Draculaesque vampire bat, and Kala, a female cat, as they embark on a search for Santa Claus, who is reported missing on Christmas Eve. The film aired on December 1 of the same year on The CW's Vortexx Saturday morning cartoon block, which billed the airing as a "world premiere".

Web series 

In 2016, a YouTube animated web series called Gummibär and Friends was released online on the official Gummibär YouTube channel, consisting of one season of 39 episodes. The International versions were released on a channel named "Gummy Bear Show International" starting on April 1, 2020.

Discography

 I Am Your Gummy Bear (2007)
 La La Love to Dance (2010)
 Christmas Jollies (2010)
 Party Pop (2015)
 The Gummy Bear Album (2019)
 Gummy Bear Album 2020 (2020)
 Holiday Fun Time (2021)

References

External links
 
 Gummybear International website
 
 
Gummy Bear on LastFM

 
Internet memes
Internet humor
Fictional characters introduced in 2006
Fictional musicians
Fictional singers
2000s fads and trends
Fictional bears
Dance-pop musicians
German house musicians
2006 establishments in Germany
German pop musicians
Confectionery in fiction
German comedy musical groups